The 2005 Swedish Golf Tour, known as the Telia Tour for sponsorship reasons, was the 20th season of the Swedish Golf Tour, a series of professional golf tournaments for women held in Sweden and Finland.

Anna Tybring won three events and Nina Reis won the Order of Merit.

Schedule
The season consisted of 14 tournaments played between May and September, where one event was held in Finland.

See also
2005 Swedish Golf Tour (men's tour)

References

External links
Official homepage of the Swedish Golf Tour

Swedish Golf Tour (women)
Swedish Golf Tour (women)